Edina Gallovits-Hall and Sania Mirza were the defending champions, but decided not to participate.

Hsieh Su-wei and Zheng Saisai won the title. They defeated Chan Chin-wei and Han Xinyun 6–2, 6–1 in the final.

Seeds

  Jarmila Gajdošová /  Anastasia Rodionova (quarterfinals)
  Alberta Brianti /  Petra Martić (semifinals)
  Chang Kai-chen /  Jill Craybas (quarterfinals)
  Maria Kondratieva /  Sun Shengnan (first round)

Draw

References
Main Draw

Guangzhou International Women's Open - Doubles
2011 Doubles